Come Again is the third album by the Pittsburgh pop/rock band the Jaggerz, released in 1975. This was the group's last album before its twelve-year (1977-1989) break-up; another album was not released for 23 years. It is also the group's last album with Donnie Iris as a performer.

Track listing 
 "I'll Be Okay in the Morning" (H. Granati, L. Ierace)
 "Love Music" (D. Lambert, B. Potter)
 "Satisfaction Guaranteed" (D. Ierace, J. Ross, E. Faiella, F. Czuri, T. Elliot)
 "It's Me" (C. Sciarrotta)
 "Gotta Find My Way Back Home" (M. & M. Steals)
 "High Heel Rockin' Roll Shoes" (C. Sciarrotta, D. Sciarrotta)
 "Shame On You" (C. Sciarotta, D. Sciarrotta)
 "Don't It Make You Wanna Dance" (D. Sciarrotta, J. Golden, L. Ierace)
 "2 + 2" (M. Davis, M. James)
 "It's Better to Have and Don't Need (Than to Need and Don't Have)" (D. Covay)

Personnel 
 Dominic Ierace - guitar, vocals
 Jimmie Ross - bass guitar, vocals
 Benny Faiella - guitar
 Frank Czuri - keyboards
 Jim Pugliano - drums

References 

1975 albums
The Jaggerz albums